Pashupatinath may refer to:

 Pashupatinath or Pashupati, Hindu god
 Pashupatinath Temple, Kathmandu, the holiest place in Nepal and the temple of the most revered God of Nepal
 Pashupatinath Temple, Mandsaur, temple of Shree Pashupatinath in India